Yahya Jabrane (born 18 June 1991) is a Moroccan professional footballer who plays as a midfielder for Botola club Wydad AC and the Morocco national team.

International career 
On 10 November 2022, he was named in Morocco's 26-man squad for the 2022 FIFA World Cup in Qatar.

International goals
Scores and results list Morocco's goal tally first.

Futsal

Honours
Wydad AC 
Botola: 2018–19, 2020–21, 2021–22 
CAF Champions League : 2021-22 

Morocco
African Nations Championship: 2018, 2020

Individual
Best Player in Botola: 2022

References

External links
 

Living people
1991 births
Moroccan footballers
Moroccan men's futsal players
Association football midfielders
Morocco international footballers
Morocco A' international footballers
2018 African Nations Championship players
2020 African Nations Championship players
2022 FIFA World Cup players
Botola players
UAE Pro League players
MC Oujda players
Hassania Agadir players
Dibba FC players
Wydad AC players
Moroccan expatriate footballers
Moroccan expatriate sportspeople in the United Arab Emirates
Expatriate footballers in the United Arab Emirates
People from Settat